Railroad is a borough in York County, Pennsylvania, United States. The population was two hundred fifty-nine at the time of the 2020 census.

History
The borough of Railroad owes its existence, and its name, to what became the Northern Central Railway, which was built to connect Baltimore, Maryland and Harrisburg, Pennsylvania. The Railroad Borough Historic District was listed on the National Register of Historic Places in 1984.

Laura Randall described Railroad as a "tiny town of three hundred people near the Maryland border... home to the Jackson House B&B, a popular crab shack, and not much else."

Geography
Railroad is located at  (39.756761, -76.699396).

Demographics

At the time of the 2000 census, there were three hundred people, one hundred and twelve households and seventy-nine families living in the borough. 

The population density was 478.7 per square mile (183.9/km2). There were one hundred and sixteen housing units at an average density of 185.1 per square mile (71.1/km2). 

The racial makeup of the borough was 96.33% White, 1.67% African American and 2.00% Native American. Hispanic or Latino of any race were 0.67% of the population.

There were one hundred and twelve households, of which 41.1% had children under the age of eighteen living with them; 57.1% were married couples living together, 12.5% had a female householder with no husband present, and 28.6% were non-families. 24.1% of all households were made up of individuals, and 7.1% had someone living alone who was sixty-five years of age or older. 

The average household size was 2.68 and the average family size was 3.16.

29.0% of the population were under the age of eighteen, 8.3% from eighteen to twenty-four, 33.7% from twenty-five to forty-four, 20.7% from forty-five to sixty-four, and 8.3% who were sixty-five years of age or older. The median age was thirty-six years. 

For every one hundred females there were 98.7 males. For every one hundred females aged eighteen and over, there were 86.8 males.

The median household income was $37,917 and the median family income was $47,813. Males had a median income of $29,286 compared with that of $25,417 for females. The per capita income was $16,709. 

Roughly 1.3% of families and 4.7% of the population were living below the poverty line, including 16.7% of those aged sixty-five or over. None were under the age of eighteen.

References

Populated places established in 1792
Boroughs in York County, Pennsylvania
1871 establishments in Pennsylvania